Teracotona latifasciata is a moth in the  family Erebidae. It was described by Robert Herbert Carcasson in 1965. It is found in Tanzania.

References

Arctiidae genus list at Butterflies and Moths of the World of the Natural History Museum

Endemic fauna of Tanzania
Moths described in 1965
Spilosomina